Katherine Anne Stuart (born March 22, 1985) is a Canadian actress and stunt performer, born in Vancouver. She played the lead character Meg Murry in the 2003 television film A Wrinkle in Time. She is also known for her recurring role of Zoe Monroe in The 100 and in the 2017 web series Inconceivable.

Filmography

Film

Television

References

External links

Katie Stuart's LiveJournal

Living people
20th-century Canadian actresses
21st-century Canadian actresses
Actresses from Vancouver
Canadian child actresses
Canadian film actresses
Canadian television actresses
1985 births